Wyoming Station may refer to:
Wyoming station (Delaware), a former station in Wyoming, Delaware
Wyoming station (Illinois), a former station in Wyoming, Illinois
Wyoming station (Ontario), a station in Wyoming, Ontario
Wyoming station (SEPTA), a subway station in Philadelphia, Pennsylvania
Wyoming Hill (MBTA station), a commuter rail station in Melrose, Massachusetts